Pumbedita (sometimes Pumbeditha, Pumpedita, or Pumbedisa;  Pūmbəḏīṯāʾ, "The Mouth of the River,") was an ancient city located near the modern-day city of Fallujah, Iraq. It is known for having hosted the Pumbedita Academy.

History
The city of Pumbedita was said to have possessed a Jewish population since the days of Second Temple of Jerusalem. 

The city had a large Jewish population and was famed for its Pumbedita Academy - whose scholarship, together with the city of Sura, gave rise to the Babylonian Talmud. The academy there was founded by Judah ben Ezekiel in the late third century.
The academy was established after the destruction of the academy of Nehardea. Nehardea, being the capital city, was destroyed during the Persian-Palmyrian war.

The twelfth-century travel account of Benjamin of Tudela gives this description :
Two days [from Mosul is] Juba, which is Pumbeditha in Neharde’a, containing about two thousand Jews, some of them being eminent scholars. Rabbi R. Chen, R. Moshe and R. Eliakim are the principal of them. Here the traveller may see the sepulchres of R. Jehuda and R. Sh'muel opposite to two synagogues - which they erected during their lives - and the sepulchre of R. Bosthenai, the  prince of the captivity, of R. Nathan and R. Nachman B. Papa.

Guy Le Strange in his geography of Mesopotamia in the Abbasid era constructed from Ibn Serapion, (ca.900), cites the possible location for Pumbedita:
The Nahr-al-Badāt (or Budāt) was a long drainage channel taken from the left bank of the Kūfah arm of the Euphrates, at a day's journey to the north of Kūfah city, probably near the town of Kanṭarah-al-Kūfah, otherwise called Al-Kanāṭīr, ‘the Bridges,’ which doubtless carried the high road across the Badāt. This city of ‘the Bridges’ lay 27 miles south of the great Sūrā bridge of boats, and 28 miles north of Kūfah; and it probably lay adjacent to, or possibly was identical with, the Hebrew Pombedita (Arabic Fam-al-Badāt, ‘mouth of the Badāt canal’)”, mentioned by Benjamin of Tudela as a great centre of Jewish learning in Babylonia.

See also
Talmudic academies in Babylonia

References

Talmud places
Babylonia
Jewish Babylonian history
Babylonian cities